Aleksander Kossakowski (born 15 March 1994) is a Polish Paralympic athlete who competes in middle-distance running at international elite events. He is a double World bronze medalist and a double European champion in the 1500 metres.

References

1994 births
Living people
Sportspeople from Kielce
Paralympic athletes of Poland
Polish male middle-distance runners
Athletes (track and field) at the 2016 Summer Paralympics
Medalists at the World Para Athletics Championships
Medalists at the World Para Athletics European Championships
Athletes (track and field) at the 2020 Summer Paralympics
21st-century Polish people